The 2020–21 Central Coast Mariners FC season is the club's 16th season since its establishment in 2004. The club will participate in the A-League for the 16th time. The club will not compete in the 2020 FFA Cup due to the event being cancelled following the COVID-19 pandemic in Australia.

Players

Transfers

Transfers in

From academy squad

Transfers out

Contracts extensions

Pre-season and friendlies

Competitions

Overview

A-League

League table

Results summary

Results by round

Matches
The 2020–21 A-League fixtures were announced on 24 November 2020.

Finals series

Statistics

Appearances and goals
Players with no appearances not included in the list.

Goalscorers

Disciplinary record

Clean sheets

Awards
 Young Player of the Year nominee (February): Alou Kuol
 A-League Goalkeeper of the Year: Mark Birighitti
 PFA A-League Team of the Season: Mark Birighitti, Oliver Bozanic, Matt Simon, Ruon Tongyik

References

Central Coast Mariners FC seasons
2020–21 A-League season by team